George M. Baird (born December 11, 1839) was an American physician and politician from New York.

Life
He was born on December 11, 1839, in Veteran, Chemung County, New York. He attended Union School in Horseheads, and the University of Michigan. During the American Civil War he joined the 161st New York Volunteer Infantry Regiment and served from 1862 to 1865 as a Hospital Steward. He graduated from Buffalo Medical College in 1866, and practiced medicine in Millport.

In November 1877, he was elected to the New York State Assembly, nominated by a Greenback, Labor and Reform convention. He polled 2,849 votes, while the Republican candidate received 2,661; and the Democratic candidate 2,544. Baird was a member of the 101st New York State Legislature in 1878.

Sources

1839 births
Year of death missing
People from Chemung County, New York
Members of the New York State Assembly
New York (state) Greenbacks
University of Michigan alumni
University at Buffalo alumni